÷ ("Divide") is the third studio album by English singer-songwriter Ed Sheeran. It was released on 3 March 2017 through Asylum Records and Atlantic Records. "Castle on the Hill" and "Shape of You" were released as the album's lead singles on 6 January 2017. The album won the Grammy Award for Best Pop Vocal Album at the 60th Annual Grammy Awards.

The album was number one in the United Kingdom, selling 672,000 copies in its first week, making it the fastest-selling album by a male solo artist there and the highest opening behind Adele's 25 and Oasis' Be Here Now. "Divide" topped the charts in over 25 territories across the globe, including the United States, Canada, and Australia. In April 2018, the International Federation of the Phonographic Industry named ÷ the best-selling album worldwide of the year. In October 2019, it was ranked the fifth best-selling album of the 21st century in the UK.

All the tracks on the album reached the top 20 of the UK Singles Chart in the week of the album's release. The dominance of its tracks on the UK chart led to calls for change on how the single chart is compiled, and the Official Charts Company then introduced new rules limiting tracks eligible for entry in the top 100 to three per the main artist, as well as adjusting the streams-to-sales ratio for older songs. His fourth single from ÷, "Perfect", reached number one in the US, Australia and the UK, where it became the Christmas number one of 2017.

To promote the album, Sheeran embarked on a worldwide concert tour, entitled the ÷ Tour. Comprising 260 shows, it started on 16 March 2017 and ended on 26 August 2019 with the last of four homecoming gigs in Ipswich, Suffolk. By August 2019, it had become the biggest, most attended, and highest-grossing tour of all time.

Background 
On 13 December 2015, Sheeran announced a self-imposed hiatus from social media, commenting that he found himself "seeing the world through a screen and not my eyes." He further ensured that some of this time would be spent creating his third album, which he considered "the best thing I have made thus far." Exactly one year after this announcement, on 13 December 2016, Sheeran's various social media platforms posted pictures of a blank blue square to state his imminent return to music. On 1 January 2017, Sheeran officially ended his hiatus by announcing that "new music" would be released on 6 January. On 12 January 2017, Sheeran revealed the tracklist and the release date for the album with its pre-order.

Release
÷ was released on 3 March 2017 through Asylum Records.

Worldwide, on the day of its release, the tracks of the album achieved a total of 56.73 million streams on Spotify in a single day, breaking the previous record of 29 million for Starboy by the Weeknd in November 2016. In total, all tracks by Sheeran were streamed 68.7 million times that day, with the single "Shape of You" receiving 10.12 million streams, both also breaking previous records on Spotify. Both records were broken by Drake's More Life 16 days later. By its second day of release, the videos of songs from the album had achieved a cumulative one billion views on YouTube, including figures from "Shape of You" and "Castle on the Hill" released earlier.

Singles 
"Castle on the Hill" and "Shape of You", the album's lead singles, were issued on 6 January 2017. Sheeran teased the tracks on social media during the week leading up to their release, posting instrumental extracts and each song's opening lyric.

"Galway Girl" was announced as the third single via Sheeran's Twitter on 17 March 2017. It was added to BBC Radio 2's playlist the following day (18 March 2017).

On 21 August 2017, Billboard announced that "Perfect" would be the fourth single from the album. The song was sent to top 40 radio on 26 September 2017.

"Happier" was released on 27 April 2018 as the album's fifth and final single in Italy.

Promotional singles 
"How Would You Feel (Paean)" was released on 17 February 2017 as a promotional single with its pre-order.

An extended live acoustic version of "Eraser" debuted on the SB.TV YouTube channel on 28 February 2017; marking the 10th anniversary of SB.TV's involvement with YouTube, and the seventh anniversary of Sheeran's YouTube involvement with SB.TV.

"Supermarket Flowers" was released as a promotional single following Sheeran's performance at the 2018 Brit Awards.

Critical reception 

÷ received mixed to positive reviews from critics. It has been given a Metacritic score of 62 based on 17 reviews, indicating "generally favorable reviews". Maura Johnston of Rolling Stone gave a four-star review, commenting that "Ed is still showcasing pop savvy on Divide" and going on to say that he "doubles down on the blend of hip-hop bravado and everyday-bloke songwriting that helped him break out at the turn of the decade." Roisin O'Connor of The Independent also gave the album a four-star rating, claiming "[the album] leans on little asides from Sheeran's own talent" and that it was "astonishing for its sheer ambition alone". Jordan Bassett of NME described the album as "a collection that, somehow, adheres to his perfect pop template... while also being quietly weird", and that the album is "likeable", "assured but unassuming and sometimes hard to fathom". Mark Kennedy of the Associated Press, after commenting on the album's "missteps", said that it "is certain to add listeners, subtract a few weary of his inconsistency, but definitely multiply his bank account", and ultimately called Sheeran "a special talent".

Some reviews were unfavourable; Harriet Gibsone of The Guardian gave the album a two-star rating out of five, calling it "no less calculating than his peers at the very top level of pop stardom". In a negative review of 2.8 out of 10, Laura Snapes of Pitchfork stated: "considering he [Sheeran] is among the most successful songwriters in the world, a lot of his lyrics do not even scan." In another negative review, writing for Drowned in Sound, David Hillier gave ÷ a 3/10 rating, calling it "the most anodyne and bland pop album possible."

Commercial performance

United Kingdom
The album sold 232,000 physical and digital copies in the UK on its first day of release without the inclusion of streaming data, more than the sales of Sheeran's previous album x in its first week. In its three days, the album continued to increase in sales and sold over 432,000 copies, thereby topping the UK Albums Chart with just three days of availability. The album sold 63% in physical format, 31% in digital, and 6% in streaming equivalent sales. The album sold a total of 672,000 copies in the UK during its first week, making it the nation's fastest-selling album by a male artist and the third highest opening overall behind Adele's 25 (which sold 800,307 copies in its first week) and Oasis' Be Here Now (which sold 696,000 copies in its first week). In ÷ opening week, Sheeran had his first three albums chart in the top five in the UK. Additionally, it broke the record for the most top 10 songs from a single album on the UK Singles Chart (with nine songs in the top 10 in a single week as well), surpassing a record previously held by Calvin Harris. All 16 songs from the album also entered the top 20. The album reached one million sales in the UK after just 16 days. In the first half of 2017, the album pushed UK music sales up by 11.2% compared to previous year, and it was the best-selling entertainment product of year, ahead of film releases such as Rogue One: A Star Wars Story. By July 2017, the album had sold over 2 million units in the UK—1.22 million of these from physical sales and 371,000 copies from downloads, with streaming contributing 415,000 equivalent units. It has since topped the UK Albums Chart for a total of 20 non-consecutive weeks, the longest amount of time since Adele's 21 held the summit in 2011 and 2012. ÷ was the nation's highest selling album of the year with over 2,128,000 copies sold by the end of 2017.

The large number of tracks from the album on the UK Singles Chart led to calls to reconsider how the charts are compiled. In response to the controversy and to help new artists on the chart, the Official Charts Company introduced rules limiting the number of tracks by a lead artist eligible for entry in the top 100 to three, to be introduced for charts published starting 7 July 2017. It also adjusted the streams-to-sales ratio for older tracks that had declined for three consecutive weeks or any record that had charted for ten weeks to accelerate removal of existing songs. On 9 August 2019, "Barcelona" was certified platinum by the British Phonographic Industry, despite not being released as a single.

United States
÷ debuted at number one on the US Billboard 200 with 451,000 album-equivalent units, of which 322,000 were pure album sales. The tracks collectively achieved 134.6 million streams in the United States in the album's first week of availability. Ten songs from the album also debuted on the Hot 100 the same week, joining the three songs already on the chart, including "Shape of You" in its seventh week at number one. In its second week, it stayed on top of Billboard 200 with 180,000 units (87,000 copies sold), which qualified it for a Gold certification from the RIAA on 22 March 2017. By July 2017, tracks from the album had accumulated over one billion audio streams in the US. ÷ earned 2,764,000 album-equivalent units in the US throughout 2017, finishing as the year's best-selling album in the country, and was its second highest-selling album in pure copies, with 1,102,000 copies sold, behind Taylor Swift's Reputation.

Other markets
In Ireland, ÷ opened at number one as fastest-selling album of the decade with 27,600 units (including 21,300 copies), just 2,300 units below the two-times platinum certification disc. All three of Sheeran's albums were in the top five. Furthermore, the entire top 16 of the Irish Singles Chart consisted only of songs from the album. In Australia, the album opened at number one with a double Platinum certification in its first week, selling 97,014 copies. Sheeran also achieved a record with 18 songs in the Australian top 40 in the same week—16 from the album and two from Sheeran's other albums, which were also in the top five of the albums chart. It has since held the nation's summit a total of 25 non-consecutive weeks, the ninth longest total time spent there. ÷ was Australia's highest selling album of 2017 with more than 420,000 copies sold throughout the year. He also topped the charts in the Belgian region of Flanders, Germany, Italy, the Netherlands, New Zealand, and Sweden. In all, it opened at number one in over 14 countries, including 10 European nations.

It started at number two in France, selling 40,900 copies. After five months of availability, it was certified three-times platinum there, amounting to 300,000 units (sales and streaming). As of December 2017, it exceeds 334,000 sales in France. By the end of 2017, 387,000 units (physical and downloads) had been sold in France according to Pure Charts. It was ranked second on the year-end album sales chart. It received a diamond certification disc nine months after it was released, due to selling 566,492 units (with streaming). It was ranked first on the year-end album chart (including streaming). As of April 2018, it has sold 600,000 units (including streaming) in France.

As of March 2018, the album has stayed at the top of the Danish Albums Chart for 36 non-consecutive weeks, becoming the album with most weeks at number one in Denmark (since IFPI Denmark and Nielsen started tracking sales in 1993).

Worldwide

÷ was the best selling album globally of 2017, with 6.1 million copies worldwide according to the IFPI and selling 1.3 million copies in pure sales in 2018.

Track listing 

Notes
 "Shape of You" interpolates "No Scrubs" by TLC

Personnel 
Credits adapted from AllMusic and album's liner notes.

 Ed Sheeran – lead vocals , guitars , backing vocals , mandolin , bass , percussion , acoustic guitar  cello , drums , body percussion , beatbox 
 Benny Blanco – programming and keyboards , backing vocals 
 Leo Abrahams – guitar 
 Laurie Anderson – viola 
 Thomas Bartlett – keyboard and piano 
 Fenella Barton – violin II 
 Leon Bosch – double bass 
 Liam Bradley – piano , backing vocals , percussion 
 Karl Brazil – drums 
 Aoife Burke - cello 
 Archie Carter – backing vocals 
 Nick Cartledge – flute and piccolo 
 Meghan Cassidy – viola 
 Eric Clapton (as Angelo Mysterioso) – guitar solo  
 Travis Cole – backing vocals 
 Nick Cooper – cello , orchestra leader 
 Billy Cummings - backing vocals 
 Murray Cummings - backing vocals 
 Mandhira De Saram – violin I 
 Matthew Denton – violin I 
 James Dickenson – violin II 
 Alison Dods – violin II 
 Niamh Dunne – fiddle and backing vocals , percussion 
 Mike Elizondo – drum programming, synthesizer bass, piano, and keyboards 
 DJ Final – scratches 
 Brian Finnegan – tin whistle 
 Nicole Fischer - viola 
 Geo Gabriel – backing vocals 
 Oscar Golding – bass 
 Sean Graham – accordion and backing vocals , percussion 
 Laurence Love Greed – piano 
 Charys Green – clarinet 
 Peter Gregson – cello , conductor 
 Ian Hendrickson-Smith - saxophone 
 Wayne Hernandez – backing vocals 
 Will Hicks – electric guitar, percussion, and programming 
 Martyn Jackson – violin I 
 Katherine Jenkinson – cello 
 Magnus Johnston – violin I 
 Marije Johnston – violin I 
 Simon Hewitt Jones – violin I 
 Patrick Kiernan – violin I 
 Labrinth - piano 
 Trevor Lawrence Jr. – drums 
 Chris Laws – drums 
 Jay Lewis – drums 
 Tim Lowe – cello 
 Steve Mac – keyboards 
 Ammar Malik – backing vocals 
 Kirsty Mangan – violin II 
 John Mayer – electric guitar solo 
 Joe McCann - backing vocals 
 Johnny McDaid – guitar , acoustic guitar , keyboards , piano , programming , backing vocals 
 Damian McKee – accordion and backing vocals , percussion 
 Lisanne Melchoir - viola 
 Jeremy Morris – violin II 
 Eamon Murray – bodhrán and backing vocals , percussion 
 Feilimidh Nunan - violin 
 ÒT - guitar 
 Pino Palladino – bass 
 Phillip Peterson – strings 
 Dierdre Reddy - violin 
 Jan Regulski – violin I 
 Rachel Roberts – viola 
 Mikey Rowe – keyboards 
 Joe Rubel – drum programming , additional guitars , synths 
 Ben Russell – double bass 
 Kotono Sato – viola 
 Nico Segal - trumpet 
 Matthew Sheeran – string arrangements 
 Hilary Skewes – coordination 
 Francis Farewell Starlite – backing vocals 
 Aura Stone - double bass 
 Yue Tang - cello 
 Leo Taylor – drums 
 Ryan Tedder – piano 
 John Tilley – piano and Hammond organ 
 Foy Vance - backing vocals 
 Anita Vedres - violin 
 Amy Wadge - backing vocals 
 Jessie Ware – backing vocals 
 Deborah Widdup – violin II

Production
 Executive producers – Ed Sheeran and Benny Blanco
 Produced by Ed Sheeran , Benny Blanco , Steve Mac , Johnny McDaid , Will Hicks , Mike Elizondo , and Labrinth 
 Co-produced by Ed Sheeran 
 Additional production by Benny Blanco 
 Original production by KillBeatz 
 Engineered by Joe Rubel , Graham Archer , Chris Sclafani , Dann Pursey , Chris Laws , and Adam Hawkins 
 Assistant engineers – Duncan Fuller , Matt Jones , George Oulton , Paul Pritchard , Jack Fairbrother , Johnny Solway , Brent Arrowood , Archie Carter , Robert Sellens 
 Mixed by Mark "Spike" Stent at The Mixsuite UK & LA
 Assisted by Geoff Swan and Michael Freeman
 Mastered by Stuart Hawkes at Metropolis Mastering, London
 Design and art direction by Jonny Costello and Charlotte Audery at Adultartclubco.uk
 Cover art photography by David Rowan
 Illustrations by Kasiq Jungwoo
 Photography by @gregwilliamsphotography
 Original cover painting by Ed Sheeran with thanks to Damian and Science for use of their machine

Charts

Weekly charts

Year-end charts

Decade-end charts

Certifications

See also 
 List of best-selling albums in Australia
 List of best-selling albums of the 2010s in the United Kingdom
 List of Billboard 200 number-one albums of 2017
 List of number-one albums of 2017 (Australia)
 List of number-one albums of 2017 (Belgium)
 List of number-one albums of 2017 (Ireland)
 List of number-one albums of 2017 (Canada)
 List of UK Albums Chart number ones of 2017
 List of number-one albums from the 2010s (New Zealand)

References

2017 albums
Albums produced by Benny Blanco
Albums produced by Ed Sheeran
Albums produced by Steve Mac
Asylum Records albums
Ed Sheeran albums
Albums produced by Labrinth
Grammy Award for Best Pop Vocal Album
Albums involved in plagiarism controversies